The 1919 Oldenburg state election was held on 23 February 1919 to elect the 48 members of the constituent assembly of the Free State of Oldenburg. The election was held in Birkenfeld on 9 March.

Results

References 

Oldenburg
Elections in Lower Saxony